Dinickel boride is a chemical compound of nickel and boron with formula .  It is one of the borides  of nickel.

The formula "" and the name "nickel boride" are often used for a nickel-boron catalyst obtained by reacting nickel salts with sodium borohydride.  However, that product is not a well-defined compound, and its bulk formula is closer to (sic).

Synthesis
Dinickel boride can be obtained (together with other nickel borides) by heating sodium borohydride with powdered  nickel metal up to 670 °C in a closed vessel, so that the released hydrogen creates a pressure of up to 3.4 MPa. The main reactions can be summarized as 
 2 ↔ 2NaH + 
 2Ni + 2 + NaH ↔  + 3 + 2 + Na
but other reactions occur, yielding other borides.

See also
 Trinickel boride

References

Borides
Nickel compounds